Snow Kid is a 1980 Chinese animated film produced by Shanghai Animation Film Studio. It is also referred to as "Snow Child". It was written by Ji Hong and directed by Lín Wénxiāo (林文肖).

Plot 
In a cold winter, mother rabbit was going to look for some carrots outside the house. In case her child would feel lonely, she made a snowman for him, which was fabulous. The snowman started to move the moment she left. He had a great time with the little rabbit. But it was getting colder and colder, thus forcing the baby rabbit to go home and make a fire to get warm. Unfortunately, he fell asleep, and his quilt fell on the floor, leaving the house in fire. The child the snowman saw this and rushed into the room without hesitation. Finally, he rescued his friend — the little rabbit, at the cost of his own life. When the mother rabbit returned, she began to break into tears after the house was burned down but was relieved to find that her son was safe and sound, but the lovely snowkid disappeared forever the two would sing a song and say their final goodbyes as snowman goes to the afterlife.

Creators

Award 
Won
 1980 — Best Film Prize from the Chinese Ministry of Culture

References

External links 
 Comments on Snowkid
 The film at China's Movie Database

1980 animated films
1980 films
Chinese animated films
1980s Mandarin-language films